The 1965 Notre Dame Fighting Irish football team represented the University of Notre Dame during the 1965 NCAA University Division football season.

Schedule

Game summaries

California

Purdue

Northwestern

Source:

Army

Southern Cal

Navy

Pittsburgh

North Carolina

Michigan State

Miami (Florida)
Notre Dame outgained Miami, 175 yards to 87 (including 115 yards rushing to negative 17), but missed field goals of 22 and 27 yards. The latter miss came with 5:15 left in the game, after a drive that had advanced to the Miami 3 yard line before going backwards. Miami had no serious scoring threats and only once made it as far as the ND 42 yard line.

References

Notre Dame
Notre Dame Fighting Irish football seasons
Notre Dame Fighting Irish football